Oscar Ferdinand Telgmann (ca. 1855 – 30 March 1946) was a German-Canadian composer of operettas, conductor and educator, and violinist best known for his operetta Leo, the Royal Cadet.

Early life

Telgmann was born in Mengeringhausen (now part of Bad Arolsen), Waldeck, Germany, to Jean Ferdinand Telgmann and Dorette Margaret Leonhardti. In 1863, at age 6 emigrated with his parents to Kingston, Ontario via New York. He began his musical studies in Canada.

Career
In 1882, with his siblings, Telgmann formed the Telgmann Concert Party, a touring ensemble. He founded, in 1892, the Kingston Conservatory of Music and School of Elocution of which he was principal for over 25 years. He led the school's student orchestra. In 1914, he founded the Kingston Symphony Orchestra, which he conducted until his retirement in 1936. 

Telgmann composed three operettas, The Miller and the Maid, King of Siam and Leo, the Royal Cadet. The latter achieved over 1,700 performances between its premiere in 1889 and 1925 and has recently been revived in a revised version. Other compositions included marches such as "Boo Hoo's Queen's Dominion Victory March" (1922) and "The Mascot: Boo Hoo's March to Queen's Rugby Team". He composed songs such as "The Nutcracker Mazurka", "Mr. Craig", "The Laird of Glenburne", and "Scotch Country Dance".

Personal life
Telgmann married Alida Jackson. Their daughter Mignon Telgmann (born 1898) was a violin teacher.

Telgmann died in Toronto in 1946 at the age of approximately 91. A music bursary established by his family in his memory and that of his daughter Mignon (born 1898) was subsequently established at Queen's University.

Works
Mascot music for Boo Hoo the Bear, "Boo Hoo's Queen's Dominion Victory March" (1922) and "The Mascot: Boo Hoo's March to Queen's Rugby Team"
 Leo, the Royal Cadet, "Ho! Ho! My Airy Fairy Maid", "Ho! Ho! My Pretty Maid", "I met him in the far away" from Opera and Operetta Excerpts; composer: Oscar Telgmann, words: George Frederick Cameron
 "Farewell, O Fragrant Pumpkin Pie" from Leo, the Royal Cadet; composer: Oscar Telgmann, words: George Frederick Cameron
 Klondyke march and two step [microform] / [music by] Oscar Ferdinand Telgmann Kingston: Music Emporium, c. 1897
 The British Whig march [for piano] / by Oscar Ferdinand Telgmann Kingston, Ont. c. 1900
 Our Premier [music] / words by George Frederick Cameron; music by Oscar Ferdinand Telgmann, Kingston, Ontario: C.J. Cameron, c. 1885 in honour of John A. Macdonald
 Scotch Country Dance for piano and violin music by Oscar Ferdinand Telgmann, Kingston, Ontario
 The Usual way for medium voice and piano by Oscar Ferdinand Telgmann, Kingston, Ontario

References

See also

 List of Canadian composers
 Music of Canada

1855 births
1946 deaths
People from Bad Arolsen
People from Waldeck (state)
German emigrants to Canada
Canadian classical composers
German classical composers
German male classical composers
German operetta composers
Musicians from Kingston, Ontario